The John Hill–Keltomaki Ranch near Brownsville, South Dakota, United States, at the original Keltomake Ranch site, includes work from 1925.

The ranch site "is an excellent example of Finnish folk building traditions coexisting with American vernacular architecture. In
addition, the barn is an extremely fine example of Finnish-Scandinavian building techniques."

His father John Hill, Sr. immigrated from Lapua, Finland.

References

Buildings and structures in Lawrence County, South Dakota
Farms on the National Register of Historic Places in South Dakota
Houses completed in 1925
National Register of Historic Places in Lawrence County, South Dakota